Dalbergia candenatensis is a species of liana, with the Vietnamese name trắc một hột (or me nước). It is now placed in the subfamily Faboideae and tribe Dalbergieae; no subspecies are listed in the Catalogue of Life.

References

External links

 
Flora of Indo-China